Daniel Leslie Schayes (born May 10, 1959) is an American former professional basketball player who played for Syracuse University and played 18 seasons in the National Basketball Association (NBA), from 1981 until 1999. At 6' 11" and 235 pounds, he played at center. He is the son of the late Dolph Schayes, who was selected for the Naismith Memorial Basketball Hall of Fame. Since his retirement from the NBA, Schayes has served as co-host of Centers of Attention, a sports talk show on ESPN Radio Syracuse in Syracuse, New York. His co-host is Etan Thomas, also a retired American professional basketball player.

Early life
Schayes was born into a Jewish family in Syracuse, New York, the son of Naomi Eva (née Gross) and Dolph Schayes, who played professional basketball and was inducted in the Hall of Fame.  His father's parents were born in Romania, and immigrated to the United States.

Schayes grew up in DeWitt, New York. He is an alum of Jamesville-Dewitt High School, where he scored 1,012 points for the basketball team. The team won the Onondaga League North title in 1977.

Schayes played on the US basketball team that won a gold medal at the 1977 Maccabiah Games in Tel Aviv, Israel; he also played for Team USA at the 1981 Maccabiah Games, which won a gold medal. He served as Head Coach of Team USA in basketball at the 2013 Maccabiah Games, which won another gold medal.

College
During his senior year at Syracuse University, the first year in which he started for the team, Schayes averaged nearly 14.6 points and 8.3 rebounds a game, and compiled 284 rebounds.  He was named to the 1981 All-Big East first team and was both an All-American and an Academic All-American.  He holds the record at the Carrier Dome for rebounds in a game (23).

Professional career
He was selected in the first round with the 13th overall pick by the Utah Jazz in the 1981 NBA Draft out of Syracuse University. Schayes was the second center to be drafted that year, with Steve Johnson of Oregon State being the first.

After spending two seasons with the Jazz, he played for several different teams, notably with the Denver Nuggets, in which he spent his best years. The highlight of his NBA career was his performance in the 1987–88 season with the Nuggets when he averaged 13.9 points and 8.2 rebounds per game. In the playoffs that season he averaged 16.4 points and 7.2 rebounds per game. He was 4th in the NBA with a .640 true shooting percentage.

He retired after the NBA lockout-shortened 1999 season, after averaging 1.5 points in an injury-plagued 19-game stint with the Orlando Magic. Schayes was briefly a member of the Minnesota Timberwolves after signing as a free agent before the start of the 1999–00 season. However, he made no appearances for them due to his injuries, and was waived. He had an 18-year career in the NBA, in which he averaged 7.7 points and 5.0 rebounds in 1,138 games.

NBA career statistics

Regular season

|-
| align="left" | 1981-82
| align="left" | Utah
| 82 || 20 || 19.8 ||.481  ||.000  ||.757  ||5.2 ||1.8 ||0.6  ||0.9 ||7.9
|-
| align="left" | 1982-83
| align="left" | Utah
| 50 ||50  ||32.8 || .449|| .000||.805|| 9.0 ||3.3 || 0.8 || 1.4 || 12.4
|-
| align="left" | 1982-83
| align="left" | Denver
| 32 || 0||20.2  || .472 ||.000||.710||5.8 ||1.3 ||0.5  ||0.9 ||9.2
|-
| align="left" | 1983-84
| align="left" | Denver
| 82||15  || 17.3 ||.493 || .000 ||.790  ||5.3  ||1.1 ||0.4  || 0.7 || 7.1
|-
| align="left" | 1984-85
| align="left" | Denver
| 56||0  || 9.7 ||.465  ||.000  || .814 || 2.6 ||0.7 ||0.4  || 0.4 || 3.6
|-
| align="left" | 1985-86
| align="left" | Denver
|80  ||13  ||20.7 ||.502  ||.000  || .777 ||5.5  ||1.0 ||0.5  || 0.8 || 8.2
|-
| align="left" | 1986-87
| align="left" | Denver
|76  ||41  ||20.5 ||.519  ||.000  || .779 ||5.0  ||1.1 ||0.3  || 1.0 || 8.5
|-
| align="left" | 1987-88
| align="left" | Denver
|81  ||74  ||26.7 ||.540  ||.000  || .836 ||8.2  ||1.3 ||0.8  || 1.1 || 13.9
|-
| align="left" | 1988-89
| align="left" | Denver
|76  ||64 ||25.2 ||.522  ||.333  || .826 ||6.6 ||1.4 ||0.6  || 1.1 || 12.8
|-
| align="left" | 1989-90
| align="left" | Denver
|53  ||22  ||22.5 ||.494  ||.000  || .852 ||6.5  ||1.2 ||0.8  || 0.8|| 10.4
|-
| align="left" | 1990-91
| align="left" | Milwaukee
|82||38 ||27.2 ||.499  ||.000  || .835 ||6.5  ||1.2 ||0.7  || 0.7 || 10.8
|-
| align="left" | 1991-92
| align="left" | Milwaukee
|43 ||4 ||16.9 ||.417  ||.000  || .771 ||3.9  ||0.8 ||0.4  || 0.4 || 5.6
|-
| align="left" | 1992-93
| align="left" | Milwaukee
|70||7 ||16.1 ||.399  ||.000  || .818 ||3.6  ||1.1 ||0.5  || 0.5 || 4.6
|-
| align="left" | 1993-94
| align="left" | Milwaukee
|23 ||6 ||10.0 ||.304 ||.000  || .955 ||2.0  ||0.2 ||0.2  || 0.3 || 2.1
|-
| align="left" | 1993-94
| align="left" | L.A. Lakers
|13 ||0 ||10.2 ||.368 ||.000  || .800 ||2.6  ||0.6 ||0.4  || 0.2 || 2.8
|-
| align="left" | 1994-95
| align="left" | Phoenix
|69 ||27 ||11.9 ||.508 ||1.000  || .725 ||3.0  ||1.3 ||0.3  || 0.5 || 4.4
|-
| align="left" | 1995-96
| align="left" | Miami
|32 ||6 ||12.5 ||.340 ||.000  || .804 ||2.8  ||0.3 ||0.3  || 0.5 || 3.2
|-
| align="left" | 1996-97
| align="left" | Orlando
|45 ||6 ||12.0 ||.392 ||.000  || .750 ||2.8  ||0.3 ||0.3  || 0.4 || 3.0
|-
| align="left" | 1997-98
| align="left" | Orlando
|74 ||33 ||17.2 ||.418 ||.000  || .807 ||3.3  ||0.6 ||0.5 || 0.4 || 5.5
|-
| align="left" | 1998-99
| align="left" | Orlando
|19 ||1 ||7.5 ||.379 ||.000  || .750 ||0.7  ||0.2 ||0.1  || 0.1 || 1.5
|- class="sortbottom"
| style="text-align:center;" colspan="2"| Career
| 1138|| 427 ||19.3  ||.481  ||.133 ||.806  ||5.0  ||1.1 || 0.5 || 0.7 ||7.7 
|-

Playoffs

|-
| style="text-align:left;"| 1983
| style="text-align:left;"| Denver
| 8 || 0 || 20.4 || .488 || .000 || .1000 || 5.0 || 1.8 || 0.3 || 0.6 || 7.1
|-
| style="text-align:left;"| 1984
| style="text-align:left;"| Denver
| 5 || 0 || 16.2 || .611 || .000 || .750 || 4.8 || 0.8 || 0.8 || 0.6 || 5.6
|-
| style="text-align:left;"| 1985
| style="text-align:left;"| Denver
| 9 || 0 || 13.1 || .423 || .000 || .700 || 3.3 || 1.3 || 0.3 || 0.3 || 4.0
|-
| style="text-align:left;"| 1986
| style="text-align:left;"| Denver
| 10 || 6 || 29.5 || .535 || .000 || .800 || 8.2 || 0.9 || 0.4 || 1.7 || 11.6
|-
| style="text-align:left;"| 1987
| style="text-align:left;"| Denver
| 3 || 0 || 25.0 || .706 || .000 || .667 || 5.7 || 0.7 || 0.3 || 0.7 || 10.0
|-
| style="text-align:left;"| 1988
| style="text-align:left;"| Denver
| 11 || 11 || 28.5 || .625 || .000 || .843 || 7.2 || 1.6 || 0.3 || 0.9 || 16.4
|-
| style="text-align:left;"| 1989
| style="text-align:left;"| Denver
| 2 || 0 || 18.0 || .143 || .000 || .750 || 5.5 || 0.5 || 0.5 || 0.5 || 4.0
|-
| style="text-align:left;"| 1991
| style="text-align:left;"| Milwaukee
| 3 || 3 || 23.7 || .391 || .000 || .909 || 4.0 || 1.0 || 1.0 || 0.3 || 9.3
|-
| style="text-align:left;"| 1995
| style="text-align:left;"| Phoenix
| 10 || 0 || 14.6 || .379 || .000 || .875 || 2.0 || 0.8 || 0.3 || 0.3 || 2.9
|-
| style="text-align:left;"| 1996
| style="text-align:left;"| Miami
| 2 || 0 || 8.5 || .750 || .000 || .500 || 2.0 || 0.0 || 0.0 || 0.0 || 3.5
|-
| style="text-align:left;"| 1997
| style="text-align:left;"| Orlando
| 5 || 2 || 18.4 || .391 || .000 || .500 || 2.4 || 1.0 || 0.4 || 0.2 || 4.4
|-
| style="text-align:left;"| 1999
| style="text-align:left;"| Orlando
| 1 || 0 || 8.0 || .000 || .000 || .000 || 0.0 || 0.0 || 0.0 || 0.0 || 0.0
|- class="sortbottom"
| style="text-align:center;" colspan=2| Career
| 69 || 22 || 20.5 || .518 || .000 || .823 || 4.8 || 1.1 || 0.4 || 0.7 || 7.8

Halls of Fame and awards
In 1989, he was inducted into the Jamesville-Dewitt High School athletic Hall of Fame. and the school retired his jersey number. Schayes was named "Best male athlete to hail from CNY" by the Post Standard in 2000. He was also added to the Syracuse University All-Century Basketball team and Hall of Fame. Schayes is also a member of the New York Jewish Sports Hall of Fame.

Personal life
Schayes is married to Wendy Lucero-Schayes, a former Olympic diver. He currently runs No Limits Investing in Phoenix, Arizona, where he now lives.

Schayes was part of a promotional campaign put on by the Anti-Defamation League that depicts him slam dunking and says, "If you believe in America, prejudice is foul play!"

While attending Syracuse University, Schayes co-founded the United Students Financial Board, which gathered more than 200 members in its inaugural year.

Since retiring from basketball, Schayes has been an active supporter of the Jewish Democratic Council of America and has spoken at numerous events, including a rally for 2004 presidential candidate John Kerry in Omaha, Nebraska.

See also
List of select Jewish basketball players
List of oldest and youngest National Basketball Association players

References

External links
Basketball stats
Player Profile at NBA.com
Orangehoops.org with a Schayes' profile
Jews in Sports bio

1959 births
Living people
American men's basketball players
American people of Romanian-Jewish descent
Basketball players from Syracuse, New York
Centers (basketball)
Denver Nuggets players
Jewish American sportspeople
Jewish men's basketball players
Los Angeles Lakers players
Maccabiah Games basketball players of the United States
Maccabiah Games gold medalists for the United States
Maccabiah Games medalists in basketball
Competitors at the 1977 Maccabiah Games
Competitors at the 1981 Maccabiah Games
Miami Heat players
Milwaukee Bucks players
Orlando Magic players
People from DeWitt, New York
Phoenix Suns players
Syracuse Orange men's basketball players
Utah Jazz draft picks
Utah Jazz players
21st-century American Jews